Military oath, also known as the oath of enlistment or swearing-in is an oath delivered by a conscript upon the enlistment into the military service of the state military. Various states has different phrasing of the oath, with the common component being the fidelity to the state and obedience to the superior officers. In the ancient times it was a very solemn procedure. In modern times, with many formal laws and regulations to maintain army discipline, it is still a solemn, but rather a formal event.

See also
Hitler Oath
Oath of office
Oath of allegiance
Schwurhand

References

Military traditions